Lana Theis (born June 23, 1965) is an American politician from Michigan. A member of the Republican Party, she has represented the 22nd district of the Michigan Senate since 2019. Theis was a member of the Michigan House of Representatives from 2015 to 2019.

Early life and education 
Theis was born on June 23, 1965, in Sturgis, Michigan. She earned a bachelor's degree in biology from California State University, Fullerton.

Career 
Theis was elected Brighton Township treasurer in 2008, and spent six years in that position. She was elected to the Michigan House of Representatives as a Republican from the 42nd district in the November 2014 election, succeeding Bill Rogers, who was ineligible to run for reelection due to term limits. She was a member of the House from 2015 to 2019. In November 2018, Theis was elected to the Michigan Senate.

Theis is among the most conservative members of the Michigan Legislature. Theis was a Ted Cruz delegate to the 2016 Republican National Convention.

Theis opposed the 2018 Michigan ballot measure to legalize the recreational use of marijuana by adults. She cosponsored an unsuccessful bill in 2018 to abolish Michigan's longstanding no-fault auto insurance system. She sponsored legislation in 2022 to ban red light cameras in Michigan.

In the 2020 presidential election, Joe Biden defeated Donald Trump; Biden won by three percentage points in Michigan. Trump subsequently launched an effort to overturn the election result and remain in power. In January 2021, Theis was one of 11 Republican Michigan state senators who promoted Trump's false claims of fraud in the 2020 election; in a letter sent to Congress on January 6, 2021, ahead of the 2021 United States Electoral College vote count, Theis and the other members of the group baselessly suggested that there were "credible allegations of election-related concerns surrounding fraud and irregularities." After a pro-Trump mob violently attacked the U.S. Capitol the same day, disrupting the certification of the election results, Theis condemned the violence. Democrats said that Theis and the other Republicans, by validating Trump's false claims, had fostered the environment had led to the attack. In June 2021, the Republican-controlled Michigan Senate Oversight Committee (of which Theis was the vice chairwoman) issued a report finding no support for Trump's claims of fraud. The report's publication angered Trump.

In 2022, Theis stated in a campaign fundraising email that State Senator Mallory McMorrow and other Democrats wanted to "groom and sexualize kindergartners". Theis' claim prompted criticism, including a denunciation from McMorrow on the Senate floor, who criticized Theis as engaging in a "hollow, hateful scheme" to raise money. Theis did not respond to her colleague's speech, and did not apologize.

In 2022, Theis won reelection to the state Senate after she was challenged in the Republican primary election by Mike Detmer, a far-right conspiracy theorist endorsed by Trump.

Personal life 
Theis and her husband, Samuel, have two children and live in Brighton, Michigan.

References

Notes

1965 births
21st-century American politicians
21st-century American women politicians
Living people
People from Brighton, Michigan
People from Sturgis, Michigan
Republican Party members of the Michigan House of Representatives
Republican Party Michigan state senators
Women state legislators in Michigan